Kandholhudhoo may refer to two places in the Republic of Maldives:
 Kandholhudhoo (Alif Alif Atoll)
 Kandholhudhoo (Raa Atoll)